The Symphony No. 5, Op. 74 by Malcolm Arnold was finished in 1961. It is in four movements:

I. Tempestuoso
II. Andante con moto – Adagio
III. Con fuoco
IV. Risoluto – Lento

The work was commissioned by the Cheltenham Festival Society. The composer conducted the first performance with the Hallé Orchestra on 3 July 1961 at the Cheltenham Music Festival in Cheltenham Town Hall.

The Symphony is a remembrance of four of Arnold's friends who died too young: 
Humorist Gerard Hoffnung
Clarinettist Frederick Thurston
Ballet choreographer David Paltenghi
Horn player Dennis Brain

Commercial recordings

1973  Malcolm Arnold and the City of Birmingham Symphony Orchestra on EMI Classics HMV ASD 2878 (LP) (latest re-release on EMI 382 1462)
1995 Richard Hickox and the London Symphony Orchestra on Chandos Records CHAN 9385 
1996 Vernon Handley and the Royal Philharmonic Orchestra on Conifer Records 75605-51257-2 (re-released on Decca 4765337)
2000 Douglas Bostock and the Munich Symphony Orchestra on Classico 294 
2001 Andrew Penny and the RTÉ National Symphony Orchestra on Naxos Records 8.552000 (recorded January 24–25, 2000, in the presence of the composer)

References
Chester-Novello page on the Symphony Contains programme notes by the composer.

Symphony No. 5
1961 compositions